Public Employees for Environmental Responsibility (PEER) is a 501(c)(3) non-profit, environmental protection organization of local, state, and national government natural resource and environmental professionals. PEER serves as a resource to potential government whistleblowers, allowing them to anonymously expose environmental wrongdoings and assisting them in redressing agency retaliation.

Founded in 1996, PEER operates primarily by investigating claims from public employees about government environmental misconduct. Because whistleblowers often face direct retaliation from the offending agencies, PEER encourages employees to act through the organization to reveal government environmental misdeeds. Once a claim is made, PEER investigates it, often using Freedom of Information Act requests. The organization then can choose to take a number of actions, including press releases or lawsuits. PEER also serves to provide legal services to whistleblowers who find themselves the target of agency retaliation. PEER was formerly affiliated with the Climate Science Legal Defense Fund, a not-for-profit organization established in 2011 to protect scientific research and researchers of climate science from think tanks and legal foundations that have taken legal action against scientific institutions and individual scientists.

Objectives of PEER
Organize a broad base of support among employees within local, state and federal resource management agencies. 
Monitor natural resource management agencies by serving as a "watch dog" for the public interest. 
Inform the administration, Congress, state officials, media and the public about substantive environmental issues of concern to PEER members. 
Defend and strengthen the legal rights of public employees who speak out about issues concerning natural resource management and environmental protection. Provide free legal assistance if and when necessary.

Campaigns 
PEER maintains campaigns in leading environmental issues. Some of their work includes

EPA library closings 
In 2006, the Environmental Protection Agency began to dismantle its network of technical libraries, an important resource for research, without Congressional approval. Upon learning of these closings, PEER brought them to the attention of Congress. Despite Congress' recent order to reopening of the libraries, the EPA continues to limit and remove library resources.

Arctic drilling debate
PEER has released e-mails and documents from current and former Interior scientists challenging the integrity of the environmental assessments of Arctic offshore oil development. These e-mails have been used to fuel lawsuits currently threatening to impede new lease sales.

Off-road recreation damage
Off–road vehicle recreation, an activity growing in popularity, can devastate local wildlife growth and disrupt the environment. PEER and Rangers for Responsible Recreation are campaigning to draw attention to the growing threat posed by off-road vehicle misuse and to assist over matched state and federal land managers.

Genetically engineered crops 
In 2011 PEER participated in a lawsuit against the United States Fish and Wildlife Service for entering into agreements which had allowed Genetically Engineered (GE) crops to be planted on 54 U.S. national wildlife refuges. Co-plaintiffs in the suit were the Center for Food Safety and Beyond Pesticides. The group also filed a lawsuit in 2012 against the White House under the Freedom of Information Act (FOIA) demanding release of an email the White House had received from Biotechnology Industry Organization (BIO), a lobbying firm which represents GE seed companies such as Monsanto. The Obama Administration had refused to release the email, claiming that doing so would reveal BIO's lobbying strategies.

Teresa Chambers
Former Chief of the United States Park Police, Teresa Chambers served for nearly 2 years before she was fired after revealing in an interview the potential dangers of their low staffing levels. PEER has provided Teresa legal defense and publicity for her appeal for reinstatement and for her wrongful firing lawsuit.

Suppression of Wolf Research 
PEER has been involved in challenging the suppression of research by the Washington Department of Fish and Wildlife and Washington State University concerning the ineffectiveness of lethal control in preventing future depredation of livestock.  They have also been critical of the Wisconsin Department of Natural Resources' lax regulation of recreational hunting and its impact on the federally endangered Great Lakes gray wolf.

PEER also maintains many campaigns in the following categories

Climate Change
Eco-Enforcement
Good Governance
Protecting Public Employees
Public Health
Public Lands
Scientific Integrity
Water and Wetlands
Whistleblowers
Wildlife Protection

Faith-based parks

PEER has worked to keep religious promotions out of public parks.

Grand Canyon National Park
The National Park Service in 2003 approved for sale in the Grand Canyon National Park bookstore Grand Canyon: A Different View: a book that presents the formation of the Grand Canyon as a result of Biblical events. PEER exposed the selling of this book as preferential treatment of a religion that toes the line of constitutional legality. On January 4, 2007 the National Park Service Chief of Public Affairs, David Barna released a response stating that the National Park Service neither uses the text in their teaching nor do they endorse its content. The release further states that the book is sold in the inspirational section of the bookstore which includes anthropological works on Native American culture. As PEER contests, the inspirational section was only created after PEER had exposed the book's sale as a natural history. The controversial book remains on sale.

The National Park Service has continued to delay the issuing of a pamphlet "Geologic Interpretive Programs: Distinguishing Science from Religion" which is meant to instruct park officials on how to respond to questions like those concerning biblical interpretations of the Grand Canyon.

Mojave National Preserve
PEER board member, Frank Buono, along with the American Civil Liberties Union of Southern California, filed a lawsuit to remove an  white cross displayed in the Mojave National Preserve. The cross, which was originally erected in 1934 as a war memorial has since undergone many changes in appearance, including the loss of its plaque. It now stands as an  white cross serving occasionally as the site for Easter sunrise services. Most recently, the order to remove the cross has been upheld by the United States Court of Appeals for the Ninth Circuit, despite four appeals by the U.S. Justice Department. The cross now awaits removal, unless there is a fifth appeal by the Justice Department that could potentially bring the case to the Supreme Court.

References

External links
Public Employees for Environmental Responsibility home page. Accessed June 6, 2009.

Environmental organizations based in the United States
Whistleblower support organizations
Public employment